This is a list of public art in Greater Manchester, England, split according to metropolitan district.

This list applies only to works of public art accessible in an outdoor public space. For example, this does not include artwork that is only visible inside a museum.

Bolton

Bury

Manchester

Oldham

Rochdale

Salford

Stockport

Tameside

Trafford

Wigan

References 

Greater Manchester
Buildings and structures in Greater Manchester
Art